The Battle of Narungombe was fought between the German Empire and Portugal during the East African Campaign of World War I.

The battle honour "Narungombe" has been granted to the Ghana Regiment, King's African Rifles and the South African 7th and 8th Infantry Regiment.

References

Narungombe
Narungombe
Narungombe
Narungombe
Narungombe
Narungombe
History of Mozambique
1910s in Portuguese Mozambique